The Scarface gang was a criminal gang possibly from Belgium, consisting of two to six men and sometimes a woman, which was responsible for a series of violent armed robberies in Belgium, the Netherlands, Germany and France. The gang was named "the Scarface gang" because one of the members of the gang dressed like the character Tony Montana from the 1983 American film Scarface.

During a violent robbery at the cash handling company SecurCash in Rotterdam, the robbers used explosives to enter the building and shot and wounded two employees. After a robbery at Brink's in Amsterdam, the gang fled in two cars on the A2 and were chased by the police but managed to escape. One of their cars crashed and it was burned by the robbers, who then hijacked a vehicle from another driver on the road.

List of robberies attributed to the Scarface gang

Fate of the gang
In December 2011 it was reported that four members of the gang had been arrested. Two members fled to Morocco, and another disappeared without a trace.

References

Gangs in Belgium
Gangs in the Netherlands
Gangs in France
Gangs in Germany